Acacia baeuerlenii is a shrub of the genus Acacia and the subgenus Plurinerves that is endemic to a small area in eastern Australia.

Description
Like most species of Acacia it has phyllodes instead of true leaves. The evergreen and ascending phyllodes usually have a narrowly elliptic and are straight to slightly incurved. Following flowering it produces hairy and leathery seed pods that are straight or occasionally twisted.

Taxonomy
The species was first formally described in 1896 by the botanists Joseph Maiden and Richard Thomas Baker as part of the work Descriptions of some new species of plants from New South Wales as published in the Proceedings of the Linnean Society of New South Wales. It was reclassified as Racosperma baeuerlenii in 1987 by Leslie Pedley then transferred back to genus Acacia in 2001. The only other synonym is Acacia baeuerleni.
The specific epithet honours William (Wilhelm) Baeuerlen who collected the type specimen. It is similar in appearance to Acacia tessellata and Acacia venulosa.

Distribution
The range of the plant extends from around Maclean and north of Red Rock and the Gibraltar Range in the north eastern New South Wales in the south up to around Helidon in south-eastern Queensland in the north. It is often sandy soils as a part of dry sclerophyll forest communities.

See also
 List of Acacia species

References

baeuerlenii
Flora of New South Wales
Flora of Queensland
Plants described in 1896
Taxa named by Joseph Maiden
Taxa named by Richard Thomas Baker